Tom Johannessen (28 July 1933 – 12 January 1991) was a Norwegian footballer. He played in four matches for the Norway national football team in 1961.

References

External links
 

1933 births
1991 deaths
Norwegian footballers
Norway international footballers
Place of birth missing
Association footballers not categorized by position